Cynane (Kynane or , Kyna; killed 323 BC) was half-sister to Alexander the Great, and daughter of Philip II by Audata, an Illyrian princess. She is estimated to have been born in 357 BC.

Biography
According to Polyaenus, Audata trained her daughter in "the arts of war" in the Illyrian tradition. Cynane's father gave her in marriage to her cousin Amyntas, by whom she had a daughter and by whose death she was left a widow in 336 BC. In the following year Alexander promised her hand, as a reward for his services, to Langarus, king of the Agrianians, but the intended bridegroom became ill and died.

Cynane continued unmarried and employed herself in the education of her daughter, Adea or Eurydice, whom she is said to have trained, after the manner of her own education, in martial exercises. It was Eurydice who took command of Cynane's troops after her death. When her half-brother Philip Arrhidaeus was chosen king in 323 BC, Cynane determined to marry Eurydice to him, and crossed over to Asia accordingly.

Out of all royal Macedonian women in the Hellenistic Period, Cynane was one of only three to fight on the front lines. Macurdy claims that Cynane killed an Illyrian queen in battle and is, in fact, one of the only women recorded to have killed an enemy in battle. She also defeated an army of the now dead Alexander the Great when facing Alcetas, brother of Perdiccas (the regent).

Her influence was probably great, and her project to marry off Eurydice alarmed Perdiccas and Antipater, the former of whom sent his brother Alcetas to meet her on her way and put her to death. Alcetas did so in defiance of the feelings of his troops, and Cynane met her doom with an undaunted spirit. Upon her death, Alcetas' troops rioted and virtually ensured Eurydice's wedding took place, which was Cynane's ultimate goal. Unfortunately, both daughter and son-in-law were eventually killed by Olympias. In 317 BC, Cassander, after defeating Olympias, buried Cynane with Eurydice and Arrhidaeus at Aegae, the royal burying-place.

Polyaenus, half a millennium later, in the second century C.E., wrote:

References

4th-century BC births
323 BC deaths
Ancient Macedonian queens consort
Family of Alexander the Great
Women in Hellenistic warfare
People who died under the regency of Perdiccas
Murdered royalty of Macedonia (ancient kingdom)
Illyrian women
4th-century BC women